Nebria kurosawai is a species of ground beetle in the Nebriinae subfamily that is endemic to Japan.

References

kurosawai
Beetles described in 1960
Beetles of Asia
Endemic fauna of Japan